Tygh Grade Summit (el. 2697 ft.) is a mountain pass in Oregon traversed by U.S. Route 197 and is located about 6.5 miles north of Tygh Valley.

References 

Mountain passes of Oregon
Transportation in Wasco County, Oregon
Landforms of Wasco County, Oregon